The Kvaevenutane Peaks are a small cluster of peaks which include Mount Kibal'chich and Mount Brounov, located  southwest of Kvaevefjellet Mountain in the Payer Mountains of Queen Maud Land, Antarctica. They were discovered and plotted from air photos by the Third German Antarctic Expedition, 1938–39. They were replotted from air photos and surveys by the Sixth Norwegian Antarctic Expedition, 1956–60, and named in association with Kvaevefjellet Mountain.

References

Mountains of Queen Maud Land
Princess Astrid Coast